Chinese Taipei at the 2017 Summer Universiade in Taipei, Taiwan as the host nation.

Medals by sport

Medalists

Official Sports

Demonstration Sports

References 

Nations at the 2017 Summer Universiade
2017
2017 in Taiwanese sport